Ban Salaeng Phan station is a railway station located in Salaeng Phan Subdistrict, Lam Plai Mat District, Buriram Province.

References 

Railway stations in Thailand
Buriram province